Zachary Michael Pearlman  (born May 19, 1988) is an American actor. He is best known for his role as Zack in The Virginity Hit. He has co-starred in short-lived television comedies such as MTV's The Inbetweeners and on the Fox sitcom Mulaney.

Early life
Pearlman was born in Royal Oak, Michigan, the son of Susan (née Weldon) and Mark Pearlman. He is the third child in the family. He has two older siblings Aaron and Allie as well as a younger sister Hannah. Pearlman is of Jewish descent. He is a 2006 graduate of Pioneer High School (Ann Arbor, Michigan).

Growing up he was very active in local Ann Arbor, Michigan comedy and theatre.

Career
Pearlman's acting career began after he submitted an entry for a contest with the website Funny or Die and was given the opportunity to audition for a role in the film The Virginity Hit. Pearlman landed a lead role in the film, which was released in September 2010. To increase the realism of the film, the directors gave Pearlman and his castmates cameras to film many of the scenes themselves. Pearlman began his television career as Leslie Kaczander in the season 1 finale of Breaking In. Pearlman played Jay in the American remake of the British series The Inbetweeners on MTV, but the series was cancelled after one season due to low viewership.

Filmography

Film

Television

References

External links

Living people
Male actors from Michigan
American male film actors
American male television actors
People from Royal Oak, Michigan
21st-century American male actors
Actors from Ann Arbor, Michigan
Jewish American male actors
21st-century American Jews
1988 births